Murta con membrillo (English: Chilean guava (Ugni molinae) with quince) is a typical dessert from southern Chile where the Chilean guava shrub is common. It is made by boiling the quince and Chilean guava berries together with sugar.

References

Chilean desserts